Facobly (also spelled Facobli) is a town in western Ivory Coast. It is a sub-prefecture of and seat of Facobly Department in Guémon Region, Montagnes District. Facobly is also a commune.

In 2014, the population of the sub-prefecture of Facobly was 22,407.

Villages
The seventeen villages of the sub-prefecture of Facobly and their population in 2014 are:

Notable people 
 Serey Dié (born 7 November 1984), Ivorian international footballer

Notes

Sub-prefectures of Guémon
Communes of Guémon